Vagococcus zengguangii is a Gram-positive bacterium from the genus of Vagococcus which has been isolated from the faeces of a yak from the Tibetan Plateau.

References 

Lactobacillales
Bacteria described in 2021